The Dominican Republic will compete at the 2022 World Athletics Championships in Eugene, Oregon, from 15 to 24 July.

Medalists

Team
The Dominican Republic will be coached by Félix Sánchez, José Ludwig Rubio and Yaseen Pérez and will be composed by 11 athletes (7 men and 4 women). But the two times Olympic medallist Luguelín Santos announced he wouldn't be able to participate because he has contracted COVID-19.

Results

Men
Track and road events

Women
Track and road events

Field events

Mixed

References

External links
Oregon22｜WCH 22｜World Athletics

Nations at the 2022 World Athletics Championships
World Championships in Athletics
Dominican Republic at the World Championships in Athletics